Romain Bruno Légaré (4 June 1925 – 30 September 2020) was a Canadian missionary. He founded many educational centers in Madagascar.

Biography
Légaré was born in Princeville, Quebec on 4 June 1925, the fifth of nine children of Rosaire Légaré and Alphonsine Perreault. He lived in a peasant farming family. He attended primary school in his rural environment. At the age of 14, he entered the Brothers of the Sacred Heart to help prepare for his entry into normal school. He obtained his diploma in the 1940s and became a religion teacher.

Légaré became a full-time teacher at the age of 20. He then became a missionary, choosing the name "Brother Romain" and decided to "become a missionary, for the kingdom of God, to serve without borders!".

Légaré left for Madagascar in 1950. He settled in Ambalavao, 400 km from Antananarivo. The following year, his superiors brought him to the École Européenne Sacré-Cœur. As head of the school, he opened it to Malagasy students. Living in a nation ill-prepared for independence, the École du Sacré-Cœur provided a gateway to a university education for many young students. In 1980, Brother Romain was moved to Toliara to do similar work to Ambalavao. He founded the Collège du Sacré-Cœur de Tsianaloky, similar to the École du Sacré-Cœur and contained approximately 3000 students. The Association SacréCœur Omnisports was highly successful in multiple sports, including handball, judo, and others.

Légaré once again moved to Ambatolampy in 2000 at the age of 75. He aided with the village's workshops, the orphanage, farming school, boarding school, and general education college.

Romain Bruno Légaré died on 30 September 2020 in Sherbrooke at the age of 95.

Distinctions
Grand Cross of the National Order of Madagascar
Member of the Order of Canada
Pro Ecclesia et Pontifice
Officer of the Ordre des Palmes académiques
Knight of the Legion of Honour

References

Canadian Roman Catholic missionaries
Roman Catholic missionaries in Madagascar
Canadian educators
20th-century Canadian educators
Chevaliers of the Ordre des Palmes Académiques
Recipients of the Legion of Honour
1925 births
2020 deaths
Canadian expatriates in Madagascar
Recipients of orders, decorations, and medals of Madagascar